Insisters was an NDW Band, in the early 1980s. Band members were e.g. Rosa Precht and Ilonka Breitmeier.

Discography

Singles 
Moderne Zeiten (1981)
Subkultur Reggae (1981)
Helmut - Karo Ceh (1982)

Albums 
Moderne Zeiten (1981)

External links 
 http://www.ichwillspass.de/ndw/bands/cosa.htm
 http://www.ilonka-breitmeier.de

German musical groups